Zhaojue Temple is a Buddhist temple located in Chenghua District of Chengdu, Sichuan, China. Zhaojue Temple has been burned down and rebuilt several times, due to the natural disasters and wars, the modern temple was completed in 1984.

History

Tang dynasty
The original temple dates back to the 7th century, during the Zhenguan period (627–649) of the Tang dynasty (618–907). At that time it initially called "Jianyuan Temple". Then Emperor Xuanzong (847–860) renowned it "Zhaojue Temple".

In 877, in the reign of Emperor Xizong (874–888), master Xiumeng was proposed as the new abbot of the temple. During his tenure, Zhaojue Temple was largely extended.

Five Dynasties and Ten Kingdoms period
Zhaojue Temple was badly damaged in wars during the Five Dynasties and Ten Kingdoms period (907–960).

Song dynasty
In 1008, in the region of Emperor Zhenzong of the Song dynasty (960–1279), master Yanmei was unanimously chosen as abbot of Zhaojue Temple. He spent 30 years to restore the temple. Under his leadership, the temple had reached unprecedented heyday with over 300 halls and buildings.

In the late Northern Song and early Southern Song dynasties, Yuanwu Keqin, an accomplished Chan master, who served two separate terms as abbot of Zhaojue Temple, where he died here.

Ming dynasty
In 1387, in the 20th year of Hongwu period of the newly founded Ming dynasty (1368–1644), Hongwu Emperor order Prince Xian to invite master Zhirun to the temple as the new abbot. Under the support of central government, the temple came to a resurgence of religiosity.

In 1644, the year of the fall of the Ming dynasty, Zhaojue Temple was devastated by wars. Then master Poshan refurbished and redecorated it.

Qing dynasty
In 1663, in the Kangxi era of the Qing dynasty (1644–1911), abbot Zhangxue renovated Zhaojue Temple, Mahavira Hall, Four Heavenly Kings Hall, Buddhist Texts Library, Yuanjue Hall, Octagonal Pavilion were added to the temple. Ten years later, abbot Foyuan erected the Five Contemplations Dining Hall, Bell tower, Drum tower, and monk's apartment.

Republic of China
In May 1920, Zhu De, the then brigade commander of Yunnan National Protection Army, was defeated by Xiong Kewu, commander of Sichuan Army, then he took refuge in Zhaojue Temple.

People's Republic of China
In 1966, Mao Zedong launched the Cultural Revolution, then the Red Guards had attacked the temple, almost all volumes of sutras, historical documents, statues and other works of art were either removed, damaged or destroyed. In the late Cultural Revolution, it became a part of the Beijiao Park.

After the 3rd Plenary Session of the 11th Central Committee of the Chinese Communist Party, according to the national policy of free religious belief, the temple reactivated its religious activities.

Zhaojue Temple has been classified as a National Key Buddhist Temple in Han Chinese Area by the State Council of China in 1983. The reconstruction project of the temple was launched in the following year. Shanmen, Octagonal Pavilion, Four Heavenly Kings Hall, Hall of Ksitigarbha, Hall of Guanyin, Hall of Skanda, Buddhist Texts Library, Five Contemplations Dining Hall, Stone Buddha Hall, Xianjue Hall were gradually rebuilt.

Architecture

Mahavira Hall
The Mahavira Hall enshrining the Three-Body Buddha, namely Vairocana, Rocana, Sakyamuni. The two disciples' statues are placed in front of the statue of Sakyamuni, the older is called Kassapa Buddha and the middle-aged is called Ananda. The statues of Eighteen Arhats stand on both sides of the hall.

References

Buddhist temples in Chengdu
Buildings and structures in Chengdu
Tourist attractions in Chengdu
1984 establishments in China
20th-century Buddhist temples
Religious buildings and structures completed in 1984